William Colchester (1513/14 – 1565 or later), of Cardiff, Glamorganshire, was a Welsh politician.

He was a Member (MP) of the Parliament of England for Cardiff in November 1554.

References

1510s births
Year of death missing
16th-century Welsh politicians
Politicians from Cardiff
Members of the Parliament of England (pre-1707) for constituencies in Wales